MVL may refer to:

Businesses and corporations
 Marvel Entertainment; New York Stock Exchange symbol MVL
 Melville Corporation; former New York Stock Exchange symbol MVL
 Mvelaphanda Resources Limited; JSE Securities Exchange symbol MVL

Mathematics, science and technology
 Man Vehicle Laboratory, a research group at the Massachusetts Institute of Technology
 Mercury-vapor lamp, a type of gas-discharge lamp
 Multi-valued logic, a propositional calculus with more than two truth values

People
 Mario Vargas Llosa (born 1936), Peruvian-Spanish writer
 Maxime Vachier-Lagrave (born 1990), International Grandmaster of chess from France

Sports
 Miami Valley League, Ohio, United States
 Mountain Valley League, a high school athletic league in California, United States

Transport
 Malavli railway station, India; Indian Railways station code MVL
 Malvern Link railway station, England; National Rail station code MVL
 Mavial Magadan Airlines; ICAO airline code MVL
 Morrisville-Stowe State Airport, Vermont, United States; IATA airport code MVL

Other uses
 Members voluntary liquidation, a type of company liquidation
 Minnesota Valley Lutheran High School, a private Lutheran high school in New Ulm, Minnesota